Bloyce Thompson is a Canadian politician, who was elected to the Legislative Assembly of Prince Edward Island in the 2019 Prince Edward Island general election. He represents the district of Stanhope-Marshfield as a member of the Progressive Conservative Party of Prince Edward Island.

Prior to his election to the legislature, Thompson worked as a dairy farmer.

Electoral record

References 

Living people
Progressive Conservative Party of Prince Edward Island MLAs
People from Queens County, Prince Edward Island
21st-century Canadian politicians
Year of birth missing (living people)
Members of the Executive Council of Prince Edward Island
Dairy farmers